El Compadre (The Buddy) was a pickup truck of Honduran origin manufactured during the 1970s and 1980s.

History 
In 1970 Honduras experienced a military dictatorship led by Oswaldo Lopez Arellano. The coup kept the country in relative calm. Honduras had one the lowest crime rates in the Americas. During the period the country maintained economic stability and projects were carried out with public spending. At the beginning of the decade, and with the help of General Motors, the local manufacture of a truck began. It was not as elegant as imported trucks, it was suitable for hard work in rural areas and was affordable for locals.

The engine was a British Bedford Motors product, imported from the United Kingdom. The truck was assembled by Centroamericana de Ensamblaje y Fabricación, a company located near Toncontín airport. Sales were light because the design did not appeal to buyers.

Characteristic 
It was a small truck. It did not use much fuel. Its specifications rated it to carry half a ton, but in practice it carried three times as much. It had a two-person cabin and a cargo bed and could reach 120 km/h.

Variations 
After seeing the Honduran project, other Central American countries began to imitate it. Similar models were sold in Nicaragua, El Salvador, Guatemala and Costa Rica under the names "Pinolero", "Cherito", "Chato" and "Amigo"., respectively. Some brands had more pleasing designs.

See also 
 History of Honduras

References 

History of Honduras
Car brands